Variovorax gossypii is a Gram-negative and small rod-shaped bacterium from the genus of Variovorax which has been isolated from the plant Gossypium hirsutum from Tallassee in the United States.

References

Comamonadaceae
Bacteria described in 2015